= Campo de le Gate =

Square in Venice, Italy

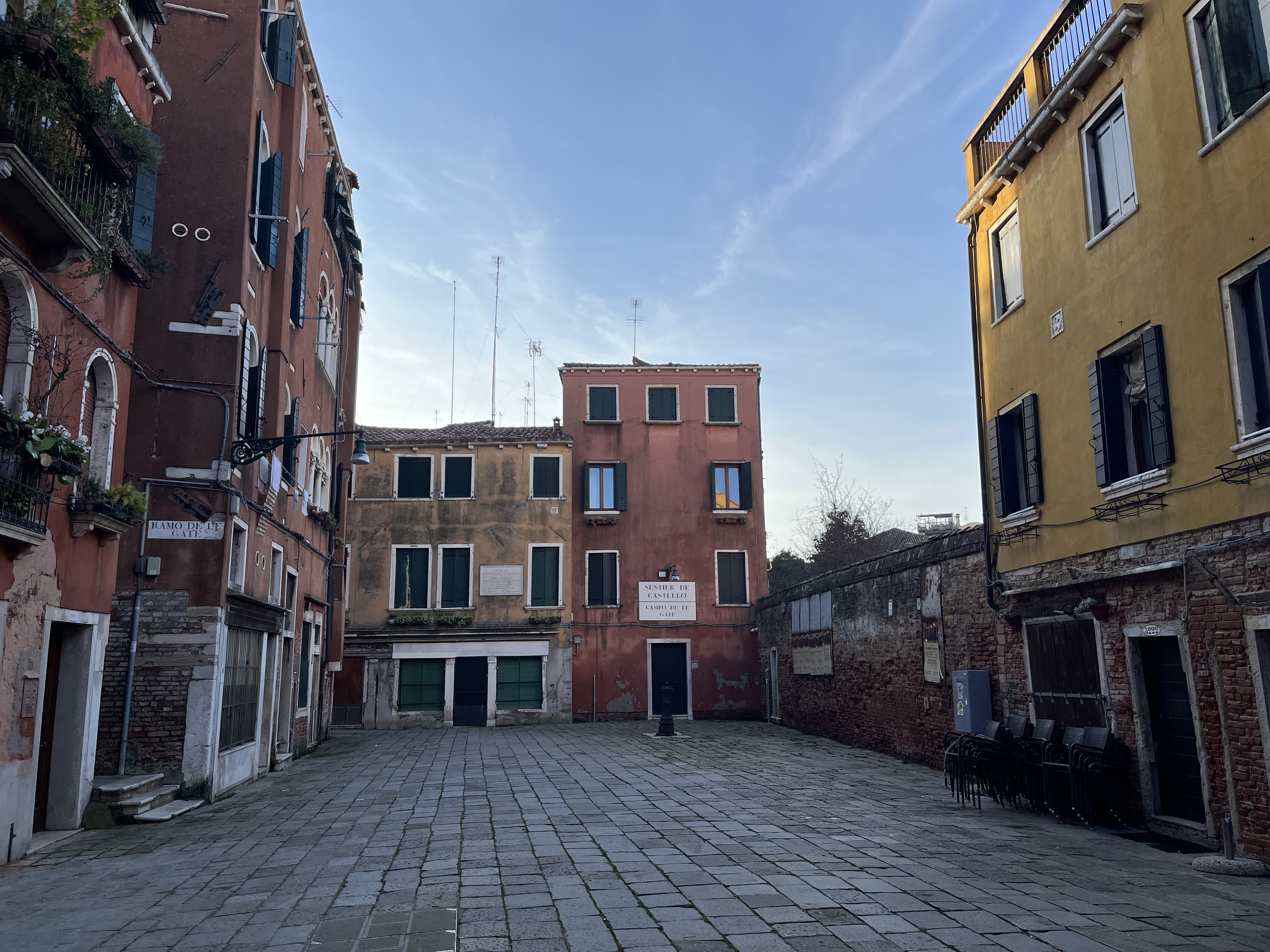
The square in 2025

Campo de le Gate is a square in Venice, Italy.
